Charles B. Hitchcock ( – May 20, 1875) was an American politician from Maryland. He served as a member of the Maryland House of Delegates, representing Harford County in 1864.

Career
Hitchcock was a member of the Maryland House of Delegates, representing Harford County in 1864. He was elected on the Unconditional Union Party ticket.

In 1866 and 1867, Hitchcock served as a town commissioner of Havre de Grace. Hitchcock served as a collector on the Susquehanna and Tidewater Canal upon until his resignation in 1872.

Personal life
Hitchcock died on May 20, 1875, at the age of 56, at his home near Havre de Grace.

References

Year of birth uncertain
1810s births
1875 deaths
People from Havre de Grace, Maryland
Members of the Maryland House of Delegates